The Tales of Sanctuary City is a media franchise created and managed by Australian children's production company Like a Photon Creative. The franchise revolves around the anthropomorphic animals who reside in Sanctuary City, which was inspired by the fauna and landscape of Australia. As of 2021, the franchise consists of three feature films and a mobile app, with the possibility of a TV series, toy-line and further apps and spin-off films.

All three films were directed by Ricard Cussó (who also wrote the first film), produced by Kristen Souvlis and Nadine Bates (the owners of Like a Photon Creative) and distributed by Odin's Eye Entertainment. The first film received generally negative reviews from critics, and the final two received mixed to positive reviews.

Films 

Like a Photon Creative launched the franchise with a trilogy of animated feature films. They were backed and funded by Screen Queensland and Screen Australia, and distributed by Odin Eye's Entertainment. The films were directed by Ricard Cussó and produced by Like a Photon's Kristen Souvlis and Nadine Bates.

The Wishmas Tree (2019) 

A young possum's misguided wish for a white Wishmas unintentionally freezes her entire hometown of Sanctuary City and threatens the lives of all who live there. Before the magical Wishmas Tree dies, she must undertake a journey into The Wild in order to reverse the damage she caused and save the city.

Pre-production started in September 2018 and animation in January 2019. It had its world premiere at the Brisbane International Film Festival on 5 October 2019, and was released in Australian theatres on 27 February 2020.

Combat Wombat (2020) 

Lazy wombat Maggie Diggins becomes Combat Wombat, Sanctuary City's new superhero after she begrudgingly saves a citizen from falling to his death. However, her rising stardom displeases local superhero Flightless Feather, who hatches a plan for Maggie's demise. But in the process, Maggie uncovers a conspiracy that could put the city in grave danger, and it is up to her to expose it.

Combat Wombat was released in Australian theatres on 15 October 2020. It had a limited release to 42 screens.

Daisy Quokka: World's Scariest Animal (2020) 

The unbearably adorable, eternally optimistic Quokka named Daisy has an impossible dream – to win the World's Scariest Animal competition of Sanctuary City.

The film had its world premiere at the Children's International Film Festival (CHIFF) in Australia on 28 November 2020, and opened in theatres with a limited release in Australia in January 2021 due to the impact of the COVID-19 pandemic on cinemas. The film received generally mixed to positive reviews from critics.

Future 
Although the trilogy has concluded, Like a Photon has stated there is a possibility for further spin-off films.

Reception

Box office performance

Critical reception

References

External links 
Like a Photon Creative's website

 
Mass media franchises
Film franchises